Miroslav Katětov (March 17, 1918, Chembar, Russia – December 15, 1995) was a Czech mathematician, chess master, and psychologist. His research interests in mathematics included topology and functional analysis. He was an author of the Katětov–Tong insertion theorem. From 1953 to 1957 he was rector of Charles University in Prague.

External links 
 Biography
 

1918 births
1995 deaths
People from Penza Oblast
Czechoslovak mathematicians
Topologists
Czech chess players
Czech psychologists
Charles University alumni
Rectors of Charles University
Czech expatriates in Russia
20th-century chess players
20th-century psychologists
Soviet emigrants to Czechoslovakia